Harald Eriksson (or Ericsson, 22 September 1921 – 20 May 2015) was a Swedish cross-country skier who won the silver medal in the 50 km event at the 1948 Winter Olympics in St. Moritz. The same year he won the 50 km at the Holmenkollen ski festival. He had to withdraw from the 50 km race at the 1952 Games due to a high fever.

Eriksson served in the Swedish Army in Umeå, but had good opportunities to train because his commander was also chairman of his skiing club. He later worked at a sports shop in Umeå, together with his friends and rivals Gunnar Karlsson and Martin Lundström; the trio formed a successful relay team.

Cross-country skiing results
All results are sourced from the International Ski Federation (FIS).

Olympic Games
 1 medal – (1 silver)

References

External links

 
 Obituary – Västerbottens Kuriren : 29 May 2015; page 54, under the name Harald Ericson

1921 births
2015 deaths
Cross-country skiers at the 1948 Winter Olympics
Holmenkollen Ski Festival winners
Swedish male cross-country skiers
Olympic medalists in cross-country skiing
Medalists at the 1948 Winter Olympics
Olympic silver medalists for Sweden